William Patton may refer to:

William Patton (preacher) (1798–1879), American preacher
William Weston Patton (1821–1899), his son, American abolitionist
William Hampton Patton (1853–1918), American entomologist

William Patton (architect), English-born, American architect of churches including Church of Our Saviour (Placerville, California)
Will Patton (born 1954), American actor
Billy Joe Patton (1922–2011), American amateur golfer

See also
William Patten (disambiguation)
William Paton (disambiguation)
William Patton Thornton (1817–1883), American physician and educator